Hamza Abdi Barre is a Somali politician currently serving as the Prime Minister of the Federal Government of Somalia. He was nominated on 15 June 2022, by President Hassan Sheikh Mohamud, and he was endorsed by parliament on June 25, 2022 (229 in favour, 7 opposed, 1 abstention). Hamza is also a parliamentarian elected to the House of the People of the Federal Parliament of Somalia on 28 December 2021, representing the Afmadow constituency of Middle Juba.

Early life and education
Hamza was born in Kismayo, Lower Juba, to the Ogaden branch of the Darod clan.

Hamza completed his primary education in the country, and received his bachelor's degree from the University of Science and Technology in Yemen in 2001. From 2003 to 2004, Hamza was the Executive Director of the Formal Private Education Network in Somalia (FPENS), a school in Mogadishu. In August 2005, Hamza became a co-founder of Kismayo University. In 2009, Hamza received his Master's degree from the International Islamic University in Malaysia. After obtaining his Master's degree and before entering into his political career, Hamza spent many years as an educator in Kismayo and Mogadishu, including becoming a senior lecturer at Mogadishu University.

Political career 
Barre has long been a supporter of the Union for Peace and Development Party, holding various positions in the offices of the federal government. From 2014 to 2015, Barre was the administrative advisor to the governor of Banaadir region and later to the mayor of Mogadishu, Hassan Mohamed Hussein. Barre also served as a senior adviser to the Ministry of Constitutional Affairs and Federalism. His largest political positions before becoming Prime Minister were as the secretary-general of the Peace and Development Party under President Mohamud from 2011 to 2017, and as chairman of the Jubbaland Electoral Commission from 2019 to 2020 under President Mohamed Abdullahi Mohamed. Since 26 June 2022, Barre has served as the Prime Minister of Somalia beside President Mohamud, elected exactly one month prior.

See also 
 2022 in Somalia

References 

21st-century prime ministers of Somalia
Living people
People from Kismayo
People from Lower Juba
Year of birth missing (living people)